John Howard Purnell OBE FRSC (17 August 1925 Rhondda, South Wales – 12 January 1996 Swansea, Wales) was a Welsh chemist.

Education 
He attended Maes y Dderwen County School in Ystradgynlais before attending Pentre Secondary School.

After graduating with a first class honours in chemistry at University College, Cardiff in 1946 he went on to the University of Wales and received a PhD in 1952.

Career 
Purnell began to work in the field of gas chromatography in this field in 1952 at Cambridge University while working with Professor R. G. W. Norrish. In 1965 he became Professor of Physical Chemistry at University College, Swansea where he remained until his retirement in 1992.

He was president of the Royal Society of Chemistry between 1994 and 1996.

Honours and awards
1971 Beilby Medal and Prize of the Royal Society of Chemistry
1992 Officer of the Order of the British Empire (OBE), 1992 New Year Honours

References 

1925 births
Place of birth missing
1996 deaths
Place of death missing
Alumni of Cardiff University
Alumni of the University of Wales
Welsh chemists
Officers of the Order of the British Empire